Miodrag Lazić (31 May 195514 April 2020) was a Serbian surgeon and writer best known for being a volunteer war surgeon for the Serbian Army of Krajina during the Croatian War and Army of Republika Srpska during the Bosnian War. Pavle, Serbian Patriarch awarded him the Order of Saint Sava for his war efforts. During this period, he wrote the autobiographical work "Diary of a War Surgeon (Knin 1991 - Serbian Sarajevo 1995)".

He died on 14 April 2020, in Niš due to complications caused by COVID-19 infection.

References 

1955 births
2020 deaths
People from Zemun
People from Niš
Serbian surgeons
University of Belgrade Faculty of Medicine alumni
Recipients of the Order of St. Sava
Army of Republika Srpska soldiers
Deaths from the COVID-19 pandemic in Serbia